3rd ZAI Awards

Presenter  Union of Authors and Performers 

Broadcaster STV 

Grand Prix Marián Varga

◄ 2nd │ 4th ►

The 3rd ZAI Awards, honoring the best in the Slovak music industry for individual achievements for the year of 1992, took place and time in Bratislava in 1993.

Winners

Main categories

Others

References

External links
 ZAI Awards > Winners (Official site)

03
Zai Awards
1992 music awards